Marc Planus (born 7 March 1982) is a French former professional footballer who played as a defender. A one-club man, he played his entire professional career for his local club Bordeaux.

Club career
Planus made his league debut on 9 November 2002, against Rennes. He went on to play seventeen games in Ligue 1 in the 2002–03 season.

It was the first of more than 200 league matches. In 2006–07 and 2008–09 he won the Coupe de la Ligue (scoring a goal in the 2009 final) and in both 2008–09 and 2009–10 he won the Trophée des Champions. At the end of the 2014–15 Ligue 1 season, Planus announced his retirement from football.

International career
Planus was called up to the France national team squad for the 2010 FIFA World Cup, where France was eliminated in the group stage. In 2010, he earned his only cap for the France national team, in a match against Tunisia.

Honours
Bordeaux
Ligue 1: 2008–09
Coupe de France: 2012–13
Coupe de la Ligue: 2006–07, 2008–09
Trophée des Champions: 2008, 2009

See also
List of one-club men

References

External links

 
 

1982 births
Living people
French footballers
Footballers from Bordeaux
Association football defenders
France international footballers
2010 FIFA World Cup players
Ligue 1 players
FC Girondins de Bordeaux players